The following is a list of symbols associated with the occult. This list shares a number of entries with the list of alchemical symbols as well as the list of sigils of demons.


List

See also
Iconography
Planet symbols

References

Art and Symbols of the Occult: Images of Power and Wisdom by James Wasserman (Destiny Books, 1993)
Masonic and Occult Symbols Illustrated by Cathy Burns (Sharing, 1998)

 
Occult